Coginchaug is an area within the current United States town of Durham, Connecticut. It is largely a swampy, low-lying region of the town, drained by the Coginchaug River and its tributaries.

History

Historically, it was the Native American name of the area used by the Mattabesset tribe for hunting. It is said to have meant "Great Swamp" or "Long Swamp."

According to William Chauncey Fowler's "History of Durham," land in Coginchaug was first deeded in 1662 to John Talcott by the General Court. In 1672, a deed was written between the native proprietors of the territory and Europeans who wished to purchase it from them. Entitled "Deed of Cawginchaug from Tarramuggus, &c.," we can read verbatim about the transfer of "one Tract of land commonly known by the name of Cawginchaug" from the native inhabitants to the European settlers.

As the former name of Durham, Coginchaug has been reused by the Regional School District #13, encompassing Durham, Connecticut, and Middlefield, Connecticut, to label its jointly used high school Coginchaug Regional High School. The Coginchaug Soccer Club takes its name from it as well.

Durham, Connecticut
Geography of Middlesex County, Connecticut